Charopus is a genus of beetles belonging to the family Melyridae.

Species:
 Charopus apicalis Kiesenwetter 1859
 Charopus bonadonai Pardo 1962
 Charopus concolor (Fabricius 1801)

References

Melyridae
Cleroidea genera